The Austrian Football Bundesliga 2008–09 was the 97th season of top-tier football in Austria. The competition is officially called tipp3-Bundesliga powered by T-Mobile, named after the Austrian betting company tipp3 and the Austrian branch of German mobile phone company T-Mobile. The season started on 8 July 2008 with Sturm Graz beating defending champions Rapid Vienna by 3–1. The 36th and last round of matches took place on 31 May 2009.

Team changes from last season
Fußballclub Wacker Innsbruck were relegated after finishing the 2007–08 season in 10th and last place. They were replaced by First League champions Kapfenberger SV.

Overview

Stadia and locations

Personnel

Managerial changes

League table

Results
Teams played each other four times in the league. In the first half of the season each team played every other team twice (home and away), and then did the same in the second half of the season.

First half of season

Second half of season

Top goalscorers
Source: bundesliga.at

See also
 2008–09 Austrian Football First League
 2008–09 Austrian Cup

References

External links
 Official website 
 oefb.at  
 soccerway.com

Austrian Football Bundesliga seasons
Austria
1